Morgan Hwang (born 18 April 1941) is a Taiwanese business executive and politician.

Early career
Hwang earned a degree in economics from National Chung Hsing University's Taipei campus. He then obtained a master's and doctoral degree in business management from National Chengchi University. His teaching career, some of which was spent at NCHU, spanned three decades.

He became chairman of Taiwan Tobacco and Liquor Corporation in October 2002, shortly after TTL had been renamed from the Taiwan Tobacco and Wine Monopoly Bureau. Weeks after taking the position, Hwang backed government efforts to test for bootleg rice wine, announcing that TTL would provide free wine testing in partnerships with local authorities. He stated in 2003 that TTL's Long Life cigarettes would be sold in China. However, the products did not hit the Chinese market until late 2004. Hwang's attempt to market Taiwan Beer in China saw similar delays. Under Hwang, TTL also turned to younger drinkers and the international market to expand business. As chairman, Hwang explored privatization of the company with multiple investors. However, employees rejected the plan in an April 2004 vote. Later, Hwang stated that privatization would still occur.

In July 2005, Huang assumed the chairmanship of the Taiwan Power Company.

Ministry of Economic Affairs
Hwang was appointed Minister of Economic Affairs in January 2006. He approved Taipower's first rate increase in 23 years that May. In June, Huang visited Indonesia, the first time since 2001 that a Taiwanese cabinet official was invited to an economic conference there. Later that month, Hwang signed a free trade agreement with Nicuraugua, represented by Alejandro José Arguello Choiseul. Hwang stepped down from the Ministry of Economic Affairs in August 2006.

References

1941 births
Living people
National Chengchi University alumni
National Chung Hsing University alumni
Taiwanese Ministers of Economic Affairs
Politicians of the Republic of China on Taiwan from Changhua County
Taiwanese chairpersons of corporations
Academic staff of the National Chung Hsing University